Headin' Home is a 1920 American silent biopic sports film directed by Lawrence C. Windom. It attempts to create a mythology surrounding the life of baseball player Babe Ruth.

The screenplay was written by Arthur "Bugs" Baer from a story by Earle Browne. Besides Ruth, it stars Ruth Taylor, William Sheer, and Margaret Seddon.

It was filmed largely in Haverstraw, New York

Plot summary
Ruth stars in the film, playing himself, but the details of his life are completely fictionalized. In the film, Ruth comes from a small country town and has a loving home life, but in real life, he grew up in Baltimore, Maryland, and spent most of his childhood in a reformatory. In the film, shades of the 1984 baseball movie The Natural, Ruth cuts down a tree to make his own bat.

Cast
Babe Ruth as Babe
Ruth Taylor as Mildred Tobin
William Sheer as Harry Knight
Margaret Seddon as Babe's Mother
Frances Victory as Pigtails
James A. Marcus as Simon Tobin
Ralf Harolde as John Tobin
Charles Byer as David Talmadge
George Halpin as Doc Hedges / The Constable / Dog Catcher
William J. Gross as Eliar Lott
Walter Lawrence as Tony Marino
Ann Brody as Mrs. Tony Marino
Ricca Allen as Almira Worters
Sammy Blum as Jimbo Jones
Ethel Kerwin as Kitty Wilson
Tom Cameron as Deacon Flack
Charles J. Hunt as Reverend David Talmadge
William Shea
Raoul Walsh as supervisor

See also
Babe Comes Home (1927), also starring Babe Ruth

References

External links

1920 films
1920s sports comedy-drama films
American sports comedy-drama films
American black-and-white films
American silent feature films
American baseball films
Articles containing video clips
Babe Ruth
Cultural depictions of Babe Ruth
Biographical films about sportspeople
Films directed by Lawrence C. Windom
1920s English-language films
1920s American films
Silent American comedy-drama films